Mount Sir Alexander, is a 3,275-metre, ultra-prominent (10,745-feet) mountain in the Sir Alexander Area of the Continental Ranges (sometimes referred to as the Northern Continental Ranges), Canadian Rockies located in British Columbia. 

Located with in Kakwa Provincial Park & Protected Area, Mount Sir Alexander is the most northern peak over 3,200-metres (10,500-feet) in the Rocky Mountains.  Originally named Mt. Kitchi, the mountain was renamed Sir Alexander in 1917 in honour of Sir Alexander Mackenzie, who was the first European to cross North America in 1793.  Mackenzie and his party passed within 80 km of the mountain, although he likely never saw it as he was travelling along the Fraser River, well below peak visibility.

References 

Mountains of British Columbia